James Christopher Flynn (1852 – 15 November 1922) was an Irish nationalist politician who served for 25 years as a member of the Irish Parliamentary Party in the House of Commons of what was then the United Kingdom of Great Britain and Ireland.

Flynn was elected at the 1885 general election as the Member of Parliament (MP) for North Cork, and was re-elected unopposed at the next 5 general elections. When the Irish Party split in 1891, Flynn sided with the Anti-Parnellite majority, joining the Irish National Federation. He rejoined the united party when the split was resolved in 1900. He held his seat until he stood down from the Commons at the January 1910 general election.

He argued for parliament's working hours to be altered. He was arrested under the Crimes Act in February 1888 for conspiracy.

References

External links 
 
 

1852 births
1922 deaths
Irish Parliamentary Party MPs
Members of the Parliament of the United Kingdom for County Cork constituencies (1801–1922)
UK MPs 1885–1886
UK MPs 1886–1892
Anti-Parnellite MPs
UK MPs 1892–1895
UK MPs 1895–1900
UK MPs 1900–1906
UK MPs 1906–1910